{{DISPLAYTITLE:Nu1 Lupi}}

Nu1 Lupi (ν1 Lup) is a solitary star in the southern constellation of Lupus. It is visible to the naked eye with an apparent visual magnitude of 5.01. It is a high proper motion star with an annual parallax shift of 27.89 mas as seen from Earth, yielding a distance estimate of 117 light years from the Sun.

This is a two billion year old evolved star with a stellar classification of F6 III-IV, indicating that the spectrum has characteristics intermediate between a subgiant and giant star. The star has an estimated 1.67 times the mass of the Sun and is spinning slowly with a projected rotational velocity of 2.8 km/s.

See also
 Nu2 Lupi

References

F-type subgiants
F-type giants
Lupus (constellation)
Lupi, Nu1
3901
136351
075206
5698
Durchmusterung objects